OJSC Amur Shipbuilding Plant (Amurskiy Sudostroitelnyy Zavod, and also called the "Leninskiy Komsomol Shipyard") is an important shipyard in eastern Russia, based in Komsomolsk-on-Amur, and founded in 1932. It employs 15,000 people, and produces both civilian and military ships, including nuclear submarines.

Around 97 submarines (56 nuclear-powered and 41 conventional) as well as 36 warships were built at the yard. The shipyard started building nuclear submarines in 1957, with the first one completed in 1960. Submarines built at the Amur Shipbuilding plant include Delta I class ballistic missile submarines, Echo I and II class cruise missile submarines and Akula-class attack submarines.
In 1992, then-president Boris Yeltsin announced that the Sevmash shipyard in Severodvinsk would remain the only nuclear submarine construction site.

In 2008, the first nuclear submarine built at the shipyard in 13 years suffered an accident during sea trials, killing 20 people.

Previously privately owned, it was sold in May 2009 for a nominal price of a few thousand roubles to the state-controlled United Shipbuilding Corporation.

References

External links
 Official site

United Shipbuilding Corporation
Shipbuilding companies of the Soviet Union
Companies based in Khabarovsk Krai
1932 establishments in the Soviet Union